BRP Lapu-Lapu (MMOV-5001) (also known as DA BRAR MMOV 5001) is one of two Multi-mission offshore civilian patrol vessel of Bureau of Fisheries and Aquatic Resources. The ship was locally manufactured in the Philippines by the Josefa Slipways, Inc. in Navotas. It was launched on August 10, 2017 and was commissioned into service on December 21, 2017. Its intended mission is to guard Philippine waters against illegal fishing.

See also 
BRP Francisco Dagohoy (MMOV-5002)
Bureau of Fisheries and Aquatic Resources

References 

Patrol vessels of the Philippines
Ships of the Bureau of Fisheries and Aquatic Resources
2017 ships